The 1974 All-Pacific-8 Conference football team consists of American football players chosen by various organizations for All-Pacific-8 Conference teams for the 1974 NCAA Division I football season.

Offensive selections

Quarterbacks
 Steve Bartkowski, California

Running backs
 Anthony Davis, USC
 Chuck Muncie, California

Wide receivers
 Steve Rivera, California
 Norm Andersen, UCLA

Tight ends
 Jim Obradovich, USC

Tackles
 Jeff Hart, Oregon State
 Marvin Powell, USC

Guards
 Steve Ostermann, Washington State
 Bill Bain, USC

Centers
 Geoff Reece, Washington State

Defensive selections

Linemen
 Gary Jeter, USC
 Art Riley, USC
 Pat Donovan, Stanford

Linebackers
 Gary Larsen, Washington State
 Ed Powell, USC
 Gordon Riegel, Stanford
 Richard Wood, USC

Defensive backs
 Marvin Cobb, USC
 Steve Donnelly, Oregon
 Charles Phillips, USC
 Danny Reece, USC

Special teams

Placekicker
 Chris Limahelu, USC

Punter
Skip Boyd, Washington

Key

See also
1974 College Football All-America Team

References

All-Pacific-8 Conference Football Team
All-Pac-12 Conference football teams